Michael Chapdelaine (born September 15, 1956 in San Diego, California) is an American guitarist.

Chapedelaine is the only guitarist ever to win First Prize in the world's top competitions in both the Classical and Fingerstyle genres. He won the Guitar Foundation of America International Classical Guitar Competition and the National Fingerstyle Championships at the Walnut Valley Bluegrass Festival in Winfield, Kansas. His performances, played on both steel string and classical guitars, include musical styles ranging from blues to Bach to country to rhythm 'n' blues.

In the '80s and '90s Chapdelaine twice won the coveted National Endowment for the Arts Solo Recitalist Grant and took First Prize in both the Guitar Foundation of America's and the Music Teachers National Association's Guitar Competitions. He also won the Silver Medal in Venezuela's VIII Concurso International de Guitarra "Alirio Diaz". He has toured four continents while giving hundreds of performances for Affiliate Artists Inc., and various arts promotion organizations. In 1992 he recorded the Sonata Romantica CD, (now re-released as "Mexico"), about which Acoustic Guitar magazine (January 1993) wrote "... if I were marooned on a desert island with a limited selection of recordings, this one would be among my choices...I have seldom heard a more beautiful album. Other young guitarists have excellent technique, but few have such style and musicality, and Chapdelaine's beautiful tone is the nearest to Segovia's that I can recall."

In 1994 Chapdelaine turned his attention to pop music, in arranging, producing, and recording Time-Life Music's Guitar by Moonlight collection (also released as "with love"), which sold 250,000 copies in its first two years in the stores. In 1998, he won the National Fingerpicking Championships at Winfield.

Chapdelaine is Professor of Music and head of guitar studies at the University of New Mexico, and has previously been on the faculties of the University of Colorado at Denver and Metropolitan State University. He has given master classes throughout the world including, China, Thailand, Malaysia, Peru, Venezuela, Taiwan, Indonesia, and at institutions such as University of Miami, Mannes School of Music, University of Texas, and California State University.

Discography 
 The dbx Reels (1989)
 Mexico (1992)
 Time-Life Music's "with love" (1995)
 Land of Enchantment (1998)
 Spanish Roses (1999)
 Yamaha Sampler (2001)
 Replay (2001)
 Bach Is Cool (2004)
 Guitar for Christmas (2003)
 Portrait de Femme (2005)
 Grapevine Reserve (2005)
 Guitar Man (2008)
 The Somogyi Incident (2014)
 Counterpoint Boundaries, Homage to Michael Hedges (2018)

References

External links 
 Official website
 Video Interview with Michael Chapdelaine

American acoustic guitarists
American male guitarists
Fingerstyle guitarists
Living people
1956 births
20th-century American guitarists
20th-century American male musicians
University of New Mexico faculty
University of Colorado Denver faculty